Alcides Eduardo Mendes de Araújo Alves (born 13 March 1985), known simply as Alcides, is a Brazilian former professional footballer who played as either a right back or a central defender.

Club career
Born in São José do Rio Preto, São Paulo, and a product of Salvador da Bahia-based Esporte Clube Vitória's youth system, Alcides had a short loan spell with FC Schalke 04 in Germany still in his teens. After a quick stint with Santos FC in his country, he returned the following season to Europe and signed with S.L. Benfica in Portugal, playing seven times as Benfica won the league after an 11-year wait; at this time, he was already owned by Chelsea, which he never represented.

In January 2007 Alcides moved to PSV Eindhoven, going on to work with former Benfica boss Ronald Koeman, who said of him: "He [Alcides] is an extra re-inforcement for the defence and he can play in several positions at the back. He is tall, very thin and extremely fast." On 3 February he played his first Eredivisie match for the club, against AZ Alkmaar. During his one half season-spell he helped the side to back-to-back national championships, appearing in 21 league games in the 2007–08 campaign (one goal) inclusively as a left back.

On 9 August 2008, Alcides signed with Ukraine's FC Dnipro Dnipropetrovsk.

International career
Alcides helped Brazil win the 2003 FIFA World Youth Championship, in the United Arab Emirates, appearing in all the matches.

Personal life
Alcides was kidnapped in Brazil, but was released after he convinced his abductors he was not a football player.

See also

List of kidnappings

Honours

Club

Schalke 04
UEFA Intertoto Cup: 2003

Benfica
Primeira Liga: 2004–05
Taça de Portugal: Runner-up 2004–05

PSV
Eredivisie: 2006–07, 2007–08
Johan Cruijff Shield: Runner-up 2007

Brazil U-20
FIFA U-20 World Cup: 2003

References

External links
 
 
 
 

1985 births
Living people
People from São José do Rio Preto
Brazilian footballers
Association football defenders
Campeonato Brasileiro Série A players
Esporte Clube Vitória players
Santos FC players
Clube Náutico Capibaribe players
Associação Ferroviária de Esportes players
Club Athletico Paranaense players
Criciúma Esporte Clube players
Bundesliga players
FC Schalke 04 players
Primeira Liga players
S.L. Benfica footballers
Chelsea F.C. players
Eredivisie players
PSV Eindhoven players
Kidnapped Brazilian people
Ukrainian Premier League players
FC Dnipro players
Brazil under-20 international footballers
Brazilian expatriate footballers
Expatriate footballers in Germany
Expatriate footballers in Portugal
Expatriate footballers in the Netherlands
Expatriate footballers in Ukraine
Brazilian expatriate sportspeople in Germany
Brazilian expatriate sportspeople in Portugal
Brazilian expatriate sportspeople in the Netherlands
Brazilian expatriate sportspeople in Ukraine
Footballers from São Paulo (state)